Tandem is a para-cycling classification for cyclists that require a sighted pilot for a non-sighted rider. The UCI recommends this be coded as  MB.
PBS defined this group as "Athletes who are blind or visually impaired compete with no classification system. They ride tandem with a sighted “pilot.”" The Telegraph defined this classification in 2011 as "B: Athletes who are blind and visually impaired"  British Cycling defines this classification as: "Blind or Visual Impaired (VI), TCB - from no light perception in either eye up to visual acuity of 6/60 and/or visual field of less than 20 degrees. Classification assessed in the best eye with the best correction (i.e. all athletes who use contact or corrective lenses must wear them for classification, whether they intend to wear them in competition or not). Classification will be provided by a UCI accredited classifier"

Classification history
Cycling first became a Paralympic sport at the 1988 Summer Paralympics.

In September 2006, governance for para-cycling passed from the International Paralympic Committee's International Cycling Committee to UCI at a meeting in Switzerland.  When this happened, the responsibility of classifying the sport also changed.

Becoming classified
Classification is handled by Union Cycliste Internationale.  Classification for the UCI Para-Cycling World Championships is completed by at least two classification panels.  Members of the classification panel must not have a relationship with the cyclist and must not be involved in the World Championships in any other role than as classifier.  In national competitions, the classification is handled by the national cycling federation. Classification often has three components: physical, technical and observation assessment.

Records
Below are some historical world records for this classification in the 200m men's Indoor track / Flying start.

Rules
The sighted cyclist cannot be a professional cyclist in the past 12 months on any UCI pro tour with the exception of those over 40 years of age.  The pair of cyclists must cycle in sync with each other.

Rankings
This classification has UCI rankings for elite competitors.

See also

 Para-cycling classification
 Cycling at the Summer Paralympics

References

Para-cycling classification
Parasports classifications